The Summer Jam at Watkins Glen was a July 1973 rock festival  outside Watkins Glen, New York, that featured the Allman Brothers Band, Grateful Dead and the Band. The July 28, 1973 event long held the Guinness Book of World Records entry for "largest audience at a pop festival," with an estimated 600,000 fans in attendance at the Watkins Glen Grand Prix Raceway.  Approximately 150,000 tickets were purchased in advance, the rest being admitted in what became a "free concert".

History
The concert was produced by Shelly Finkel and Jim Koplik, two promoters who had organized a successful Grateful Dead concert at Dillon Stadium, Hartford, Connecticut, in 1972.  At that show the Grateful Dead were joined on-stage by Dickey Betts, Berry Oakley, and Jai Johanny Johanson, members of the Allman Brothers Band. This impromptu jam planted the seeds that would eventually spawn the "Summer Jam" concert in Watkins Glen, New York.

Similar to the 1969 Woodstock Festival, an enormous traffic jam created chaos for those who attempted to make it to the concert site. Long and narrow country roads forced fans to abandon their vehicles and walk 5–8 miles on that hot summer day. 150,000 tickets were sold for $10 each, but for all the other people it was a free concert.

Also similar to Woodstock, there were no reports of violence at Watkins Glen.  However, unknown to attendees, the day was marred by the death of Willard Smith, 35, a skydiver from Syracuse, New York. One of the flares he dove with ignited his body suit, and he was engulfed in flames. Smith's body was eventually found in the woods near the concert site. There is also the unsolved disappearance of two high school teenagers (Mitchel Weiser and Bonnie Bickwit) from Brooklyn who were hitchhiking to the concert.

Summer Jam was the last concert event to be held at Watkins Glen International until 2011, when the rock band Phish organized and performed at a three day festival, called Super Ball IX, at the complex.

Production
Bill Graham's FM Productions provided lights, staging and a 50,000-watt sound system. The sound system introduced a new concept: digital delay lines to compensate for the speed of sound in air, allowing speaker towers to be placed at intervals from the stage, allowing distant audience members to hear clearly, and see the performers move in exact time to the sound they were hearing. The concept became a staple at festivals, and known as "delay stacks".

New Jersey electronics company Eventide brought three digital delay units each capable of 200 milliseconds of delay. Four speaker towers were placed  from the stage, their signal delayed 175 ms to compensate for the speed of sound between the main stage speakers and the delay towers. Six more speaker towers were placed 400 feet from the stage, requiring 350 ms of delay, and a further six towers were placed 600 feet away from the stage, fed with 525 ms of delay, the audio signal coming through all three modules.

The most distant audience areas were unable to see the stage because of terrain, but they could hear the concert. Each Eventide DDL 1745 module contained many 1000-bit shift register integrated chips, and cost the same as a new car. The concept meant that the people in the front were not blasted with too much sound in an attempt to reach the back, and the people in the back enjoyed high fidelity sound. The system worked very well.

Performance
Although the concert was scheduled to start on July 28, thousands of music fans were already at the concert site on the 27th. Robbie Robertson of The Band requested to do a soundcheck, but was perplexed that so many people were sitting in front of the stage. Bill Graham allowed the soundcheck with the crowd of people in front, and the Band ran through a few numbers to the delight of the audience. The Allman Brothers Band did their soundcheck next, playing "One Way Out" and "Ramblin' Man". Grateful Dead's soundcheck turned into a legendary two-set marathon, featuring their familiar tunes such as "Sugaree", "Tennessee Jed" and "Wharf Rat". They also performed a unique jam that was eventually included on their retrospective CD box set So Many Roads (1965-1995).

On July 28, the day of the concert, 600,000 music fans had arrived in Watkins Glen. Grateful Dead performed first, playing two long sets. They opened with "Bertha" and played many hits such as "Box Of Rain", "Jack Straw", "Playing in the Band", "China Cat Sunflower" and "Eyes of the World".

The Band followed the Dead with one two-hour set. However, their set was cut in half by a drenching thunderstorm; in a scene again reminiscent of Woodstock, people were covered with mud. During the storm, keyboardist Garth Hudson performed his signature organ improvisation "The Genetic Method"; when the rain finally let up, the full Band joined Hudson on stage, and segued into their signature song "Chest Fever".

Finally, the Allman Brothers Band performed for three hours. Their performance included songs from their soon-to-be-released album Brothers and Sisters, along with their standards "In Memory of Elizabeth Reed", "Statesboro Blues", "Les Brers in A Minor" and "Whipping Post".

Following the Allmans' second set, there was an hour encore jam featuring musicians from all three bands. The jam featured spirited renditions of "Not Fade Away", "Mountain Jam", and "Johnny B. Goode".

Discography
The Allman Brothers Band — Wipe the Windows, Check the Oil, Dollar Gas (Capricorn Records, 1976). "Come And Go Blues" was recorded on July 28. 
The Band — Live at Watkins Glen (Capitol Records, 1995). Purported to be a 10-song excerpt from their set, only two tracks - an impromptu organ solo during a rain delay by Garth Hudson and a jam session - are from the festival.  The rest are either studio cuts with overdubbed crowd sounds or performances from other shows, including one cut from the Woodstock Festival in 1969.
Grateful Dead — So Many Roads (1965–1995) (Arista Records, 1999). This 5-disc box set includes an 18-minute jam performed as part of the Dead's sound check the day before the concert.

See also

List of jam band music festivals 
List of historic rock festivals

References

External links
Book excerpt on the Watkins Glen rock festival from "Aquarius Rising" by Robert Santelli 
Photographs of Summer Jam at Watkins Glen
Grateful Dead Live at Grand Prix Racecourse on 1973-07-28 (July 28, 1973) Audiorecording
Discussion of Grateful Dead's Watkins Jam Recordings
more photos from the Watkins Glen Summer Jam festival
 

Concerts in the United States
Rock festivals in the United States
July 1973 events in the United States
Jam band festivals
Music festivals established in 1973
1973 music festivals